Joseph or Joe Mitchell may refer to:

Joseph Mitchell (city manager) (1922–1993), Newburgh, New York, city manager
Joseph Mitchell, director of OzAsia festival in Adelaide, Australia, until 2019
Joseph Mitchell (engineer) (1803–1883), Scottish civil engineer
Joseph Mitchell (Indiana judge) (1837–1890), Associate Justice of the Supreme Court of Indiana
Joseph Mitchell (Medal of Honor) (1876–1925), United States Navy sailor
Joseph Mitchell (Mitchell Estate director) (1935–2011), director of Margaret Mitchell's estate
Joseph Mitchell, New York City architect, see St. Benedict the Moor's Church (New York City)
Joseph Mitchell (politician) (1840–1897), New South Wales politician and businessman
Joseph Mitchell (writer) (1908–1996), American writer
Joseph B. Mitchell (1915–1993), American military historian
Vic Mitchell (Joseph Charles Victor Mitchell, 1934–2021), railway publisher and author
Joseph S. B. Mitchell (fl. 1980s–2010s), American computer scientist
Joe Mitchell (baseball) (fl. 1930s), American baseball player
Joe Mitchell (footballer), English footballer
Joe Mitchell (politician), member of the Iowa House of Representatives